A Cook's Tour is a travel and food show that aired on Food Network. Host Anthony Bourdain visits various countries and cities worldwide where hosts treat him to local culture and cuisine.

Two seasons of episodes were produced in 2000 and 2001 and aired first-run in January 2002 through 2003 in the U.S. on the Food Network.

Production
NYU film program graduate, Lydia Tenaglia, working at New York Times Television, picked up the book, Kitchen Confidential, and learning that Bourdain was proposing an Innocents Abroad-style travel journal as a follow-up project, Tenaglia picked up the phone and made a cold call.

The show has been filmed with two Sony PD100 DV camcorders.

Reception
In Variety, Phil Gallo says, "For once, Food Network is putting on display food you can’t do at home — and they show that acquiring the ingredients isn’t all pretty before the meal hits the dining room table." Bourdain's account of his trip to Cambodia in Episodes 5 and 6 of Season 1 has been criticised by professor of French and Film Studies at Clemson University Joseph Mai as "filled with tawdry stereotypes" and largely ignoring Cambodian cuisine.

Episodes

Season 1

Season 2

Notes 
 Episodes are categorized by region in the DVD box set; one or two regions per disk. Disk 1: The United States; Disk 2: Mexico and the Americas; Disk 3: Europe; Disk 4: Morocco and Russia; Disk 5: Australia and Japan; Disk 6: Asia
 Early versions of the DVD box set were shipped mistakenly missing episode TB1A04, Eating on the Mekong. Replacements were made available by Questar.

References

External links 

2000s American cooking television series
2002 American television series debuts
2003 American television series endings
Food travelogue television series
Food Network original programming